Domenico Gabrielli wrote seven ricercari for solo cello in 1689, some of the earliest pieces of music composed for cello in history. The first of the set is included in the RCM level six cello repertoire, and the set has been completely or partially recorded by cellists such as Josetxu Obregón, Anner Bylsma and Lisa Beznosiuk's husband Richard Tunnicliffe.

Recordings
 Celloevolution: From Bologna to Cöthen - Josetxu Obregón, 2022
 Anner Bylsma plays Cello Suites and Sonatas - Anner Bylsma, 1974
 Ricercars for solo cello - recordings  (i) Roel Dieltens (ii) Hidemi Suzuki 2005 (iii) Richard Tunnicliffe 2007 (iv) Bruno Cocset, 2012

References

Solo cello pieces
Baroque music
Italian music